Ryan Held (born June 27, 1995) is an American freestyle swimmer who specializes in the sprint events, and is currently sponsored by Arena. He holds the U.S. Open record in the long course 100 meter freestyle and three world records in short course relay events. At the 2016 Summer Olympics he won a gold medal in the 4×100 meter freestyle relay, swimming in both the prelims and the final of the event. In 2021, he won silver medals in the 50 meter freestyle and the 100 meter freestyle at the 2021 World Short Course Championships. At his first FINA World Aquatics Championships, the 2022 World Aquatics Championships, he won a gold medal in the 4×100 meter freestyle relay.

Background
He attended Christ the King grade school in Springfield, Illinois, and attended high school at Sacred-Heart Griffin, where he graduated in 2014 and was coached by Dr. James Stegeman. During his senior year in 2014, Held was named Illinois State Swimmer of the Year.

Career

2016 Summer Olympics

At the 2016 US trials he qualified for the 2016 Summer Olympics as a member of the 4×100 meter freestyle relay team. In the Olympic heats, he swam a split time of 47.79 on the second leg, impressing the coaching staff enough to give him the nod to swim in the final. Although Held's time was not as fast as Anthony Ervin’s, head coach Bob Bowman made the decision due to youth since "Younger legs, coming back so quickly".  In the final he split 47.73 on the third leg to preserve Team USA's lead, winning the gold medal together with Caeleb Dressel, Michael Phelps, and Nathan Adrian. Held and the other finals relay members won the USA Swimming Foundation Golden Goggle Award for "Relay Performance of the Year" for their performance.

2018 World Championships

At the 2018 World Short Course Championships in Hangzhou, China, Held won four gold medals and one silver medal. In the 4×100 meter freestyle relay, Held anchored the finals relay consisting of him, Caeleb Dressel, Blake Pieroni, and Michael Chadwick to a gold medal win in a world record time of 3:03.03. For the 4×50 meter mixed freestyle relay, Held split a 20.60 for the second leg of the relay and helped the finals relay set a new world record and win the gold medal in the event with a finals relay time of 1:27.89. In the final of the 4×50 meter freestyle relay, Held swam the fastest split of his relay teammates, Caeleb Dressel, Jack Conger, and Michael Chadwick, with a time of 20.25 seconds, which helped the relay win the gold medal and set a new world record in the event at 1:21.80. Gold eluded Held in the 4×50 meter medley relay where he swam the freestyle leg of the relay, earned a silver medal, and helped set an American record of 1:30.90 in the final with Ryan Murphy (backstroke), Michael Andrew (breaststroke), and Caeleb Dressel (butterfly). Concluding his competition at the Championships, Held swam the freestyle leg of the 4×100 meter medley relay, splitting a time of 45.23 seconds to help the finals relay win the gold medal and set a new Americas record and Championships record of 3:19.98 in the event.

2019
At the 2019 Phillips 66 Summer National Championships in Stanford, California, Held ranked first in the 100 meter freestyle prelims heats with a time of 47.43 seconds on July 31, which broke the U.S. Open record and Championships record of 47.58 seconds set by Jason Lezak over 11 years earlier on July 2, 2008. Later the same day in the final, Held won the 100 meter freestyle with a time of 47.39 seconds, breaking his own U.S. Open and Championships records he set earlier in the day.

2021 World Championships

Held entered to compete in the short course 50 meter freestyle and 100 meter freestyle for his individual events at the 2021 World Short Course Championships in December in Abu Dhabi, United Arab Emirates. As part of the United States team for the Championships, Held was number two on "The Week That Was" honor for the week of November 1, 2021 from Swimming World. Gaining racing experience in short course meters as preparation for the World Championships, Held competed at the 2021 Ron Johnson Masters Championship in Tempe, Arizona in November, where he swam a 21.28 and broke the Masters world record in the 50 meter freestyle for the 25–29 age group set at 21.37 by César Cielo in 2014.

On day one of competition, Held split a 46.17 for the anchor leg of the 4×100 meter freestyle relay, qualifying it to the final ranked second with prelims relay teammates Shaine Casas, Hunter Tapp, and Tom Shields. In the final, Zach Apple, substituted in for Tom Shields and the relay finished in a time of 3:05.42 to win the bronze medal. The second day, Held achieved a fourth-place finish in the 4×50 meter mixed freestyle relay with his finals relay teammates in 1:29.04, splitting a 20.86 for the lead-off leg of the relay. In the morning of day three, Held finished second in prelims heat ten of the 50 meter freestyle behind Ben Proud of Great Britain with a time of 21.01, which qualified Held for the semifinals ranking third overall. Held ranked first in the semifinals later in the day with a 20.81, less than one-tenth of a second ahead of second-ranked Joshua Liendo of Canada. On day four, Held led-off the 4×50 meter freestyle relay with a personal best time of 20.72 seconds and helped the relay achieve a time of 1:23.81, which placed them fourth. Later in the same session Held won the silver medal in the 50 meter freestyle with a personal best time of 20.70 seconds, which was the first individual medal of his career at a World Championships. In his final event of the evening, Held helped set an American record of 6:47.00 and win the gold medal in the 4×200 metre freestyle relay with finals relay teammates Kieran Smith, Trenton Julian, and Carson Foster.

In the morning of day five, Held ranked fifth in the prelims heats of the 100 meter freestyle with a 46.72, qualifying for the semifinals along with fellow American Zach Apple. Held anchored the 4×50 meter medley relay in the evening final, splitting a 20.52 to contribute to the gold-medal-winning time of 1:30.51, which tied the Russia relay team, set a new American record, and tied the Championships record and Americas record. For the semifinals of the 100 meter freestyle Held swam a 46.36, ranked fourth, and qualified for the final. In the final the following day, which was the final day of competition, Held won the silver medal with a personal best time of 45.63 seconds. On the freestyle leg of the 4×100 meter medley relay in the final, Held split a 45.43 to help achieve a time of 3:20.50 and a silver-medal-win.

2022
On April 2, at the 2022 Pro Swim Series at Northside Swim Center in San Antonio, Texas, Held tied Drew Kibler for third in rank in the prelims heats of the 100 meter freestyle with a time of 49.46 seconds and qualified for the final later in the day. He swam a 49.20 in the final to place third, finishing seven-hundredths of a second behind first-place finisher Andrej Barna.

2022 International Team Trials
Day one of the 2022 US International Team Trials in late April in Greensboro, North Carolina, Held qualified for the final of the 100 meter freestyle ranking second from the prelims heats with a time of 48.20 seconds. He placed third in the final with a time of 48.18 seconds, qualifying for the 2022 World Aquatics Championships team in the 4×100 meter freestyle relay. Day two, he qualified for the b-final of the 200 meter freestyle with a time of 1:48.93 and overall rank of 15th in the prelims heats. In the b-final, he lowered his time to a 1:47.99 to place third, 11th overall. In the 50 meter freestyle prelims heats on the morning of the fifth and final day, he ranked fourth with a 21.92 and qualified for the final. He swam a personal best time of 21.85 seconds in the final to take fourth-place.

2022 World Aquatics Championships

On the first day of swimming at the 2022 World Aquatics Championships, Held split a 47.13 for the second leg of the 4×100 meter freestyle relay in the prelims heats, the fastest out of him and his prelims relay teammates, helping qualify the relay to the final ranking first and securing his spot on the finals relay with his split time. In the final later the same day, he split the fastest out of him and his finals relay teammates with a 46.99 on the second leg of the relay, helping achieve a gold medal victory in a final time of 3:09.34. On day seven, he split a 47.85 in the preliminaries of the 4×100 meter mixed freestyle relay, helping qualify the relay to the final ranking first. In the final, he split a 47.93 for the lead-off leg, helping win the bronze medal in a time of 3:21.09. For the 4×100 metre medley relay, Held split a 47.36 for the freestyle leg of the relay in the final to help win the silver medal in 3:27.79.

Following the Championships, Held was announced to the USA Swimming roster for the 2022 Duel in the Pool, which was held starting August 19 in Sydney, Australia.

Personal bests

{| class="wikitable"
|- style="background:#eee;"
! colspan="5" | Long course
|- style="background:#eee;"
! Event
! Time
! Meet
! Date
! Note(s)
|-
|  50 m freestyle || style="text-align:center;" | 21.85
| 2022 US International Team Trials
| April 30, 2022
| 
|-
|  100 m freestyle || style="text-align:center;" | 47.39
| 2019 U.S. Summer Nationals
| July 31, 2019
| U.S. Open record, CR
|-
| 200 m freestyle || style="text-align:center;" | 1:47.57
| 2020 U.S. Olympic Trials
| June 14, 2021
| (Preliminaries)
|-
|  50 m backstroke || style="text-align:center;" | 24.59| 2018 Phillips 66 Summer National Championships
| July 27, 2018
| (Preliminaries)
|-
|  50 m butterfly || style="text-align:center;" | 23.68| 2017 Phillips 66 Summer National Championships
| July 1, 2017
| 
|-
|  100 m butterfly || style="text-align:center;" | 52.15'| 2019 U.S. Summer Nationals
| August 2, 2019
| 
|-
|}

r = relay lead-off

Continental and national records
Long course meters (50 m pool)

Short course meters (25 m pool)

Masters world records
Short course meters (25 m pool)

Awards and honors
 Swimming World, Top 12 Masters Swimmers of the Year: 2021
 Swimming World, The Week That Was: November 1, 2021 (#2)
 SwimSwam'' Top 100 (Men's): 2021 (#62), 2022 (#90)
 Golden Goggle Award, Relay Performance of the Year: 2016 (4×100 meter freestyle relay)

Personal life
In October 2021, Held publicly announced his engagement to Lexie Lupton, who he trained with during part of his time competing collegiately for the NC State Wolfpack. Held then married Lupton in December 2022.

See also
 World record progression 4 × 100 metres freestyle relay
 World record progression 4 × 50 metres freestyle relay
 List of World Swimming Championships (25 m) medalists (men)

References

External links

 
 
 
 
 

1995 births
Living people
American male freestyle swimmers
Medalists at the FINA World Swimming Championships (25 m)
Swimmers at the 2016 Summer Olympics
Olympic gold medalists for the United States in swimming
Sportspeople from Springfield, Illinois
Medalists at the 2016 Summer Olympics
NC State Wolfpack men's swimmers
Universiade medalists in swimming
Universiade gold medalists for the United States
Medalists at the 2017 Summer Universiade
World Aquatics Championships medalists in swimming